Devario udenii, is a fish belonging to the minnow family (Cyprinidae).  It is endemic to Sri Lanka. However, the validity of the species description was noted problematic by several other local ichthyologists.

Etymology
The specific name udenii, is in honor of Udeni Edirisinghe, an emeritus professor of University of Peradeniya for his contribution to the ichthyology and zoology in Sri Lanka.

Description
Body with 5–6 irregular vertical bars on anterior half. There are 14–17 pre-dorsal scales. Nuptial tubercles minute. Danionin notch present. Lateral line complete. There is a minute process on first infraorbital. Dorsum light yellowish with a bluish metallic sheen. Body silvery sheen laterally and ventrally. Vertical bars metallic blue with bright yellowish interspaces. Medial caudal rays dark blue. Other fins hyaline.

Ecology
It is found from fast flowing partially shaded waters of Homadola stream, a tributary of Gin Ganga.

References

External links

Devario
Cyprinid fish of Asia
Freshwater fish of Sri Lanka
Fish described in 2017